Fiqi Aadan is a town in the northwestern Awdal region of Somaliland. It is roughly 65 km northwest of Borama. The town is located near the mountainous and fertile Libaaxley region. The area is mainly used as a grazing point for nomads from the surrounding towns and villages.

Demographics

The region around the town is inhabited by the Reer Mahamuud And Abdilee subclan of the Bahabar 'Eli, branch of the Mahad 'Ase, a subclan of the Gadabuursi Dir clan.

See also
Administrative divisions of Somaliland
Regions of Somaliland
Districts of Somaliland

Notes

References
Abasa

Archaeological sites in Somaliland
Former populated places in Somalia
Cities of the Adal Sultanate